A force-free magnetic field is a magnetic field in which the Lorentz force is equal to zero and the magnetic pressure greatly exceeds the plasma pressure such that non-magnetic forces can be neglected. For a force-free field, the electric current density is either zero or parallel to the magnetic field.

Definition 
When a magnetic field is approximated as force-free, all non-magnetic forces are neglected and the Lorentz force vanishes. For non-magnetic forces to be neglected, it is assumed that the ratio of the plasma pressure to the magnetic pressure—the plasma β—is much less than one, i.e., . With this assumption, magnetic pressure dominates over plasma pressure such that the latter can be ignored. It is also assumed that the magnetic pressure dominates over other non-magnetic forces, such as gravity, so that these forces can similarly be ignored.

In SI units, the Lorentz force condition for a static magnetic field  can be expressed as

where

Alternatively, this can be written as

These conditions are fulfilled when the current vanishes or is parallel to the magnetic field.

Zero current density
If the current density is identically zero, then the magnetic field is the gradient of a magnetic scalar potential :

The substitution of this into  results in Laplace's equation,  which can often be readily solved, depending on the precise boundary conditions. In this case, the field is referred to as a potential field.

Nonzero current density
If the current density is not zero, then it must be parallel to the magnetic field, i.e.,  where  is a scalar function known as the force-free parameter or force-free function. This implies that

The force-free parameter can be a function of position but must be constant along field lines.

Linear force-free field
When the force-free parameter  is constant everywhere, the field is called a linear force-free field (LFFF). A constant  allows for the derivation of a vector Helmholtz equation

by taking the curl of the nonzero current density equations above.

Nonlinear force-free field
When the force-free parameter  depends on position, the field is called a nonlinear force-free field (NLFFF). In this case, the equations do not possess a general solution, and usually must be solved numerically.

Physical examples
In the Sun's upper chromosphere and corona, the plasma β can locally be of order 0.01 or lower allowing for the magnetic field to be approximated as force-free.

See also
 Woltjer's theorem
 Chandrasekhar–Kendall function
 Magnetic helicity
 List of plasma (physics) articles

References

External links
  Low, Boon Chye, "Force-Free Magnetic Fields". November 2000.

Plasma physics